Bokondini Airport  is an airport in Bokondini, Tolikara Regency, Highland Papua, Indonesia.

Airlines and destinations

References

Airports in Highland Papua